The 1920 Wisconsin Badgers football team was an American football team that represented the University of Wisconsin in the 1920 Big Ten Conference football season. The team compiled a 6–1 record (4–1 against conference opponents), finished in second place in the Big Ten Conference, shut out four of seven opponents, and outscored all opponents by a combined total of 141 to 29. John R. Richards was in his fourth year as Wisconsin's head coach.

End Frank Weston was the team captain. Guard Ralph Scott was a consensus first-team All-American. In addition, Frank Weston and center George Bunge were selected as first-team All-Americans by the Frank Menke Syndicate and Lawrence Perry, respectively. Those three (Weston, Scott, and Bunge) and Al Elliott received first-team All-Big Ten honors.

Schedule

References

Wisconsin
Wisconsin Badgers football seasons
Wisconsin Badgers football